Patiño is a replenishment oiler of the Spanish Navy. It was named after the Spanish navy minister José Patiño Rosales, who reorganized the fleet on the orders of Philip V of Spain. The vessel was ordered in 1991 from Navantia and built at their yard in Ferrol, Galicia. The ship entered service with the Spanish Navy in June 1995 and is homeported at Ferrol. Patiño has been deployed with NATO forces around the world, participating in missions in the Kosovo War, the War in Afghanistan along with the European Union's anti-piracy mission to Somalia.

Overview

Design
Patiño is a product of cooperation between the Royal Netherlands Navy and the Spanish Navy. The replenishment oiler was built to merchant ship standards.

Patiño is fitted with two Navantia / Burmeister & Wain 16V40/45 diesel engines driving a single shaft with a five-bladed controllable-pitch propeller.

The replenishment oiler is fitted with three navigation-surface search and helicopter control radars operating at I-band. The management of the ships communications is made through the Integrated Communications Control System (ICCS 3rd generation) from the Portuguese EID. The two towed units emit acoustic signals from an onboard transmitter. The vessel is also equipped with an Aldebaran Electronic Support Measures / Electronic Countermeasures (ESM / ECM) system from Spain's Indra Group.

Armament and aircraft
Patiños weapons system include two Oerlikon 20 mm/90 calibre guns and the vessel is fitted for two Izar FABA Systems Meroka 20 mm/120 calibre close-in weapon system (CIWS). The Meroka CIWS includes an infrared camera and video auto-tracker.

Patiño is designed to carry up to five helicopters. The vessel has a  flight deck and a hangar on the stern of the ship. The replenishment oiler has a normal complement of only three Sikorsky SH-3 Sea Kings with 19 air crew provided. However, the vessel can carry a maximum of two Sea Kings and three AB 212 helicopters at the same time.

Capabilities
The replenishment oiler carries  of diesel fuel and has two supply stations, one on each side of the ship for liquids and solids. The ship is also capable of stern refuelling. Patiño carries  of aviation fuel and has a  capacity for solid stores. The ship has one vertical replenishment supply station and has aircraft maintenance workshops. Patiño is equipped with medical facilities.

Service history
Patiño was ordered from Navantia on 26 December 1991 after this joint Spanish/Dutch design won over the solely Spanish AP 21 design. The vessel was laid down at Navantia's shipyard in Ferrol, Galicia and launched on 22 June 1994. Patiño was commissioned into the Spanish Navy on 16 June 1995.

Patiño participated in Operation Sharp Guard, a joint mission between the Western European Union and NATO to support the trade embargo against the former Yugoslavia. In 1998, Patiño participated in Operation Allied Action during the Kosovo War. Patiño was also involved in a long series of international naval exercises such as Joint Warrior and Seattle Mariner and has also sailed as part of the NATO Standing NATO Maritime Group 1 (SNMG1) and Standing NATO Maritime Group 2 (SNMG2).

Operation Enduring Freedom
In 2002, Patiño and the Spanish frigate  took part in Operation Enduring Freedom. Acting on US intelligence, the Spanish ships intercepted the merchant ship So San on 9 December and boarded it after the captain refused requests to stop. So San had departed North Korea with the weapons bound for Yemen. After Yemeni protest over the seizure of the ship, claiming that the delivery of the weapons was legal under existing law, So San was released and completed its journey.

Somalia, 2010 to 2015
Patiño was deployed and operates as part of the European Union's Operation Atalanta security mission. The EU force NAVFOR, a multinational mission to protect ships, patrols the region in the shipping route off the coast of Somalia. Patino was the NAVFOR flagship.

On 8 December 2010, Patiño arrived off Somalia and became the flagship of the operation under Rear Admiral Juan Rodriguez on 14 December. Her role as the flagship lasted until 21 January 2011. By the end of November 2011 the vessel returned to the Indian Ocean to take her second tour at Operation Atalanta. As a replenishment ship she supported other vessels of the operation with oil and other supplies and also escorted ships with humanitarian help to Somalia.

Pirate attack
 
In the early morning of 12 January 2012, Patiño was attacked by Somali pirates, apparently under the assumption that the ship was just a commercial vessel. The Spanish naval vessel fought off an attack by the pirates. Patiño then sent one of her helicopters to chase the attackers and captured six of them while one was reported killed. Patiño had been escorting a ship carrying food aid to Somalia for the World Food Programme.

Canada, 2016
In 2015 the Canadian and Spanish governments concluded a deal where Patiño and  would deploy with Canadian naval forces in the Atlantic as their replenishment vessel in 2016. This would be done primarily for training missions. Patiño would be made available to the Royal Canadian Navy from January to March 2016. The ship deployed with the Royal Canadian Navy beginning on 12 February 2016 for two months. The ship returned to Spain on 30 March 2016. Beginning 1 September, Patiño deployed with the Royal Canadian Navy for 79 days, returning to Ferrol on 18 November.

Notes

Citations

Sources
 
 
 

Ships of the Spanish Navy
Ships built in Spain
1994 ships
Auxiliary replenishment ship classes